Claus Costa (born 15 June 1984) is a German footballer who last played for Viktoria Köln.

References

External links
 
 

1984 births
Living people
German footballers
VfL Bochum II players
Fortuna Düsseldorf players
VfL Osnabrück players
2. Bundesliga players
3. Liga players
Association football midfielders
Hamburger SV non-playing staff